Khevi (ხევი) is a Georgian word for “gorge”. It may refer to

Khevi, an administrative-territorial unit in ancient and medieval Georgia
Khevi, a small historical-geographic area in northeastern Georgia
Khevi, a village in the Ozurgeti district, Guria region
Khevi, a village in the Chokhatauri district, Guria region